Stephen Thega (9 February 1946 – 28 September 2021) was a Kenyan boxer. He competed at the 1968 Summer Olympics and the 1972 Summer Olympics.

References

External links
 

1946 births
2021 deaths
Kenyan male boxers
Olympic boxers of Kenya
Boxers at the 1968 Summer Olympics
Boxers at the 1972 Summer Olympics
People from Murang'a
Light-heavyweight boxers